Ceratocystis corymbiicola is a plant pathogen, affecting Australian Eucalyptus species. It was first isolated from tree wounds and nitidulid beetles associated with these wounds.

References

Further reading

External links

MycoBank

Microascales
Fungi described in 2012